Ivoren Wachters is a 1998 Dutch film directed by Dana Nechushtan. The film was made for television, and is based on the 1951 novel by Simon Vestdijk.

Cast
Stijn Westenend
Cees Geel
Gwen Eckhaus
Roef Ragas
Carice van Houten
Elvira Out
Rop Verheijen

Reception
CineMagazine rated the film 3.5 stars.

References

External links 
 

Dutch drama films
1998 films
Films based on Dutch novels
Films set in the Netherlands
Netherlands in fiction
1990s Dutch-language films